The agile kangaroo rat (Dipodomys agilis) is a species of rodent in the family Heteromyidae. It is endemic to southern California in the United States.

Relatively little information has been published on the natural history, life history, ecology, or behavior of the agile kangaroo rat. The species appears to be part of the Californian kangaroo rat radiation, which is derived from a common ancestor with Ord's kangaroo rat. Best compared 19 morphological measurements from specimens from 34 populations across the species range, and concluded that the species is monotypic. An observational study found distinct habitat differences between the agile and Stephens's kangaroo rats, with the agile preferring more shrubs and lighter soils.

References

agilis
Endemic fauna of California
Fauna of the Colorado Desert
Mammals described in 1848
Taxa named by William Gambel
Taxonomy articles created by Polbot